Roger Brook is a fictional secret agent and gallant of the Napoleonic Wars era who is later identified as the Chevalier de Breuc. The series of twelve novels by Dennis Wheatley covers events from a dozen years before the French Revolution to the fall of Napoleon. Historically accurate, the series is written from the perspective of an aide-de-camp to Napoleon himself.

The Roger Brook books were written after Wheatley had been a member of Winston Churchill's Joint Planning Staff during World War II. During that period, Wheatley had accumulated much distinctive knowledge on matters relevant to the war and politics, but he was not allowed to use this knowledge in his novels because of the Official Secrets Act. He discussed the subject with Air Commodore Kenneth Collier, who came up with a suggestion about placing Wheatley's stories in the Napoleonic times instead. 

Wheatley combined his habit of doing extensive research, in this case to gather accurate historical details about the Napoleonic era, with his wartime knowledge and experience. After completing the final book in the series, Desperate Measures (1974), Wheatley decided to retire from writing fiction.

The twelve books, with the dates when first published, and the period covered by the plot of each book, are as follows:
 The Launching of Roger Brook (3 July 1947) covers 28 July 1783 - November 1787
 The Shadow of Tyburn Tree (6 May 1948) March 1788 - April 1789
 The Rising Storm (13 October 1949) April 1789 - July 1790
 The Man Who Killed the King (8 November 1951) June 1792 - August 1794
 The Dark Secret of Josephine (16 March 1955) August 1794 - April 1796
 The Rape of Venice (19 October 1959) June 1796 - December 1797
 The Sultan's Daughter (19 August 1963) February 1798 - 31 December 1799
 The Wanton Princess (22 August 1966) 1 January 1800 - 30 November 1805
 Evil in a Mask (18 August 1969) February 1807 - September 1809
 The Ravishing of Lady Mary Ware (16 August 1971) September 1809 - 1 January 1813
 The Irish Witch (20 August 1973) 1812 - 1814
 Desperate Measures (2 September 1974) 1814 - 1815

References

Book series introduced in 1947
Fictional secret agents and spies
Literary characters introduced in 1947
Male characters in literature
Novels set during the French Revolutionary War
Novels set during the Napoleonic Wars